Jamie Delgado and Jonathan Marray were the defending champions but decided not to participate together.
Delgado played alongside Ken Skupski while Marray partnered up with Dustin Brown. They went on to win the final 7–6(7–2), 2–6, [11–9] against Michal Mertiňák and Igor Zelenay.

Seeds

Draw

Draw

References
 Main Draw

BH Telecom Indoors - Doubles
2012 Doubles